Triad School, also known as Triad Christian School, is a private Conservative Baptist school in Klamath Falls, Oregon, United States.

The school has been accredited by the Association of Christian Schools International since 1996, and by the Northwest Association of Accredited Schools since 1997.

References

High schools in Klamath County, Oregon
Buildings and structures in Klamath Falls, Oregon
Private middle schools in Oregon
Private elementary schools in Oregon
Private high schools in Oregon